|}
{| class="collapsible collapsed" cellpadding="0" cellspacing="0" style="clear:right; float:right; text-align:center; font-weight:bold;" width="280px"
! colspan="3" style="border:1px solid black; background-color: #77DD77;" | Also Ran

The 2002 Epsom Derby was a horse race which took place at Epsom Downs on Saturday 8 June 2002. It was the 223rd running of the Derby, and it was won by High Chaparral. The winner was ridden by Johnny Murtagh and trained by Aidan O'Brien. The pre-race favourite Hawk Wing finished second.

Race details
 Sponsor: Vodafone
 Winner's prize money: £800,400
 Going: Good to Soft (Soft in places)
 Number of runners: 12
 Winner's time: 2m 39.45s

Full result

* The distances between the horses are shown in lengths.† Trainers are based in Great Britain unless indicated.

Winner's details
Further details of the winner, High Chaparral:

 Foaled: 1 March 1999, in Ireland
 Sire: Sadler's Wells; Dam: Kasora (Darshaan)
 Owner: Michael Tabor and Sue Magnier
 Breeder: Sean and Anne Coughlan
 Rating in 2002 International Classifications: 126

Form analysis

Two-year-old races
Notable runs by the future Derby participants as two-year-olds in 2001.

 High Chaparral – 1st Racing Post Trophy
 Hawk Wing – 2nd Railway Stakes, 1st Futurity Stakes, 1st National Stakes
 Fight Your Corner – 1st Haynes, Hanson and Clark Stakes, 1st Autumn Stakes
 Where or When – 8th Vintage Stakes, 4th Solario Stakes, 1st Somerville Tattersall Stakes, 4th Dewhurst Stakes
 Naheef – 1st Vintage Stakes, 2nd National Stakes
 Bandari – 7th Solario Stakes, 1st Silver Tankard Stakes
 Tholjanah – 2nd Solario Stakes, 2nd Royal Lodge Stakes
 Coshocton – 2nd Autumn Stakes

The road to Epsom
Early-season appearances in 2002 and trial races prior to running in the Derby.

 High Chaparral – 1st Ballysax Stakes, 1st Derrinstown Stud Derby Trial
 Hawk Wing – 2nd 2,000 Guineas
 Moon Ballad – 4th UAE Derby, 2nd Newmarket Stakes, 1st Dante Stakes
 Jelani – 4th Dante Stakes
 Fight Your Corner – 7th Feilden Stakes, 1st Chester Vase
 Where or When – 11th 2,000 Guineas, 4th Dante Stakes
 Naheef – 14th 2,000 Guineas
 Bandari – 1st Lingfield Derby Trial
 Frankies Dream – 3rd Predominate Stakes
 Coshocton – 15th 2,000 Guineas, 1st Predominate Stakes

Subsequent Group 1 wins
Group 1 / Grade I victories after running in the Derby.

 High Chaparral – Irish Derby (2002), Breeders' Cup Turf (2002, 2003 dead-heat), Irish Champion Stakes (2003)
 Hawk Wing – Eclipse Stakes (2002), Lockinge Stakes (2003)
 Moon Ballad – Dubai World Cup (2003)
 Where or When – Queen Elizabeth II Stakes (2002)

Subsequent breeding careers
Leading progeny of participants in the 2002 Epsom Derby.

Sires of Classic winners
High Chaparral (1st) - Shuttle stallion
 Dundeel also known as It's A Dundeel - 1st Randwick Guineas, Rosehill Guineas, Australian Derby (2013)
 Shoot Out - 1st Australian Derby (2010)
 So You Think - 1st W. S. Cox Plate (2009, 2010), Eclipse Stakes (2011), Irish Champion Stakes (2011)
 Toronado -1st Sussex Stakes (2013), 1st Queen Anne Stakes (2014)
 Altior - 1st Queen Mother Champion Chase (2018, 2019), 1st Celebration Chase (2017, 2018, 2019)

Sires of Group/Grade One winners
Hawk Wing (2nd) - Exported to South Korea in 2009
 Stand To Gain - 1st Sydney Cup (2011)
 Sydney Cup - 3rd 2000 Guineas Stakes 3rd Irish 2,000 Guineas (2008)
 Wing Stealth - Dam of Covert Love (1st Irish Oaks 2015)
 Lethal Weapon - 1st Durkan New Homes Juvenile Hurdle (2008)

Sires of National Hunt horses
Where Or When (6th)
 Melodic Rendezvous - 1st Tolworth Novices' Hurdle (2013)
 Myplacelater - 2nd Pride Stakes (2010)

Other Stallions
Bandari (8th) - Sired several jumps winners in sole cropJelani (4th) - Minor flat and jumps winnersMoon Ballad (3rd) - Exported to Japan - Relocated to IrelandFrankies Dream (11th) - Exported to Saudi Arabia

References
 
 sportinglife.com

External links
 Colour Chart – Derby 2002

Epsom Derby
 2002
Epsom Derby
Epsom Derby
2000s in Surrey